The Republic of Kugelmugel is a micronation located at the Prater in Vienna, Austria. The Republic declared independence in 1975, after disputes between artist Edwin Lipburger and Austrian authorities over building permits for a ball-shaped house which he erected at the Landesstraße 4091 in Katzelsdorf, Lower Austria in 1971. In 1979, Lipburger was arrested and sent to jail for ten weeks.

In June 1982, the house was moved into the Prater park, near the Hauptallee, and enclosed by eight-foot-tall barbed-wire fences. The house has the only address within the proclaimed Republic, that being "2., Antifaschismusplatz" ("2nd district of Vienna; Anti-Fascism Square"), which has since been officially adopted by the city of Vienna. Lipburger died in January 2015, but the Republic officially holds a population of over 650 non-resident citizens. Nowadays, the Republic is administered by Vienna's government and used as a tourist attraction.

The word "Kugel" means "ball" or "sphere" in German; the word "Mugel" is an Austrian German expression for "bump" or "hill on a field" and also the root for the name of mogul skiing.

References 
  The Davi Valença O mito da Wikipédia

External links 

  

Wiener Neustadt-Land District
Buildings and structures in Vienna
Micronations in Austria
1984 establishments in Austria
Visionary environments
Spherical objects